Carlo Salotti (25 July 1870 – 24 October 1947) was an Italian cardinal of the Roman Catholic Church. He served as prefect of the Congregation of Rites from 1938 until his death, and was elevated to the cardinalate in pectore in 1933.

Biography
Born in Grotte di Castro, Carlo Salotti attended the seminary in Orvieto before going to Rome, where he studied at the Pontifical Roman Athenaeum S. Apollinare and the Royal University. He was ordained to the priesthood on 22 September 1894, and then finished his studies in 1897. While performing his pastoral ministry in Rome until 1912, Salotti became a professor at his alma mater of the Pontifical Roman Athenaeum S. Apollinare in 1902. On 20 July 1915 he was raised to the rank of Domestic Prelate of His Holiness. He entered the Roman Curia on 10 July 1915 as assessor of the Congregation of Rites and subpromoter of the Faith, later becoming full Promoter of the Faith in 1925.

On 30 June 1930, Salotti was appointed Titular Archbishop of Philippopolis in Thracia by Pope Pius XI, and Secretary of the Congregation for the Propagation of the Faith, where he served under Cardinals van Rossum and Pietro Fumasoni Biondi, and rector of the Pontifical Urbaniana University four days later, on 3 July. He received his episcopal consecration on the following 6 July from Cardinal Willem van Rossum, CSSR, with Bishops Luigi Olivarès, SDB, and Giovanni Rosi serving as co-consecrators, in the basilica of Sacro Cuore di Gesù a Castro Pretorio. During his tenure as rector of the Urbaniana University, he founded the Scientific Missionary Institute of the same university.

Salotti praised Pope Pius XI for his dedication to missionary activity on Vatican Radio in October 1931, and the Pope appreciated Salotti's work as Secretary of the Congregation and accordingly elevated to the College of Cardinals on 13 March 1933 but did so only anonymously (in pectore), so as to allow him to continue his work in that field. His appointment as Cardinal-Priest of San Bartolomeo all'Isola was published in the consistory of 16 December 1935. On 14 September 1938, Salotti was named Prefect of the Congregation of Rites and participated in the 1939 papal conclave that selected Pope Pius XII, who advanced him to Cardinal Bishop of Palestrina on 11 December 1939.

Salotti died from a liver ailment in Rome, at age 77. He is buried in his native Grotte di Castro.

References

External links
Cardinals of the Holy Roman Church
Catholic-Hierarchy 

1870 births
1947 deaths
20th-century Italian cardinals
Members of the Sacred Congregation for Rites